Storås is a village in the municipality of Orkland in Trøndelag county, Norway. For most Norwegians, Storås is best known for hosting the annual festival called Storåsfestivalen since 2004. The nearest major city is Trondheim.

References

Orkland
Villages in Trøndelag